Chenar (also Romanized as Chenār, Chanār, and Chinār) is a village in Zavin Rural District, Zavin District, Kalat County, Razavi Khorasan Province, Iran. At the 2006 census, its population was 3,566, in 709 families.

References 

Populated places in Kalat County